Alfred Earl (19 March 1903  – 17 August 1951) was an English footballer who played as a right-back.

Earl was born in Earlsfield, London and joined West Ham United from Summerstown in 1925, and made a total of 191 League appearances for the east London club between 1925 and 1933. He went on to play for Streatham Town and later for French team Souchaux.

References

External links 
 http://www.westhamstats.info/westham.php?west=2&ham=211&united=Alfred_Earl

1903 births
1951 deaths
People from Earlsfield
English footballers
Association football fullbacks
West Ham United F.C. players